Eccoptocera osteomelesana is a moth of the family Tortricidae. It was first described by Otto Swezey in 1946. It is endemic to the Hawaiian island of Oahu.

External links

Eucosmini
Endemic moths of Hawaii
Moths described in 1946